The 2011 Finnish Cup is the 57th season of the main annual football (soccer) cup competition in Finland. It is organized as a single-elimination knock–out tournament. Participation in the competition is voluntary.

HJK won the cup after beating KuPS 2-1 in the final. As HJK also won the league, they qualified for the 2012–13 UEFA Champions League and KuPS will enter the first qualifying round of UEFA Europa League as losing cup finalists.

A total of 233 teams registered for the competition.  They will enter in different rounds, depending on their position within the league system.  Clubs with teams in Kolmonen (level IV) or an inferior league started the competition in Round 1. Teams from Ykkönen (level II) and Kakkonen (level III) will enter in Round 4. The 2011 Veikkausliiga clubs will start from Round 5 onwards, according to their 2011 League Cup finish; teams exiting at the group stage will enter in Round 5, the losing teams of the quarterfinals will begin in Round 6, and all semifinalists will start in Round 7.

The tournament started on 6 January 2011 with the first match of Round 1 and concluded with the Final held on 24 September 2011 at Sonera Stadium, Helsinki.

Round 1 
In this round entered 134 clubs from the Finnish fourth level and below, while the other 45 clubs received byes to the next round. These matches took place between 6 and 29 January 2011.

Round 2 
The 67 winners from the previous round and the 45 clubs who got a bye entered this round. These matches took place between 14 January and 13 February 2011.

Round 3 
The 56 winners from the previous round entered this round of the competition. These matches took place between 6 and 28 February 2011.

Round 4 
The 28 winners from the previous round and the 40 clubs from the Ykkönen and Kakkonen entered this round of the competition. These matches took place between 26 February and 21 March 2011.

Round 5 
The 34 winners from the previous round and six clubs eliminated from the group stage of the 2011 Finnish League Cup will enter this round of the competition. The draw was conducted on 3 March 2011 by Finnish FA representative Petri Jakonen. If teams from different levels were drawn together, the lower-league team were assigned as the home team. The matches of this round will take place between 17 March and 2 April 2011.

Round 6 
The 20 winners from the previous round and four clubs eliminated in the quarterfinals of the 2011 Finnish League Cup will enter this round of the competition. The draw was conducted on 24 March 2011. If teams from different levels were drawn together, the lower-league team were assigned as the home team. The matches of this round will take place between 1 and 11 April 2011.

All times UTC+3

Round 7 
The 12 winners from the last round joined the four semifinalists of the 2011 Finnish League Cup in this round of the competition. These matches were played between 15 and 23 April 2011.

All times UTC+3

Quarterfinals 
The 8 winners from the previous stage of the competition enter this round.

All times UTC+3

Semifinals 
The 4 winners from the previous stage compete in this round of the competition.

All times UTC+3

Final 

All times UTC+3

References 

2011
Finnish Cup
Cup